In the American legal system, argumentative is an evidentiary objection raised in response to a question which prompts a witness to draw inferences from facts of the case.

One common misconception is that argumentative questions are meant only to cause a witness to argue with the examiner. This error rests on misunderstanding the word "argument". Argument can mean "a series of persuasive statements" (the legal sense discussed in this article) as well as "a verbal fight or disagreement". Thus, an argumentative objection may be raised only when the lawyers themselves are making legal arguments under the guise of asking a question. "Badgering the witness" is the proper objection for a lawyer who is antagonizing or mocking a witness by asking insulting or derisive questions, perhaps in an attempt to provoke an emotional response.

Example
A lawyer on direct examination asks his witness, a layman with no legal training, "So John Doe was driving negligently?" Opposing counsel could raise an argumentative objection. In this context, "negligently" is a legal term of art with a precise and narrow meaning, and the witness cannot reasonably answer the question without understanding the relevant law. Since the lawyer is "arguing" his case that John Doe was driving negligently through the witness, the objection would be sustained and the improper statements stricken from the record.

In this example, however, the lawyer conducting the direct examination may have an opportunity to rephrase his question. If the judge sustains the argumentative objection, the lawyer may instead ask questions such as "was John Doe exceeding the posted speed limit?", "was John Doe making lane changes without proper signals?", "how did Mr. Doe respond to your comments about his driving," or "Did you feel unsafe when you were a passenger in the car driven by John Doe?"

Such questions may be permitted and require no legal expertise for a layman to answer, thus allowing the lawyer to introduce testimony about John Doe's driving habits without specifically using the legal term negligence.

References

External links
 FEDERAL RULES OF EVIDENCE: "Rule 611. Mode and Order of Interrogation and Presentation" at law.cornell.edu

Evidence law
Law of the United States